Alburnoides rossicus also known as the Russian spirlin is a species of freshwater fish in the family Cyprinidae. It is found in Dniester, South Bug and Dnieper River in the northern Sea of Azov coast and Don River drainages in the Black Sea basin, also Volga River, Caspian Sea basin from upper reaches in Tver' Province and upper reaches of Oka River downstream to Kama River and rivers and lakes of Samara Province.

References

Alburnoides
Taxa named by Lev Berg
Fish described in 1924